Ubik are an Australian punk and punk rock band from Melbourne.

History 
Ubik started as the side project of members from the band Masses, guitarist Tessa Tribe, bassist Nellie Pearson, and vocalist Ashleigh "Ash" Wyatt. The original lineup also included drummer Chris Simpson, who was introduced by Pearson. They released the singles "Piece of Mind" and "Andrew Bolts Twitter Account" on December 3, 2016, the latter named after Australian conservative commentator Andrew Bolt that, according to Vice, "explores the dangerous paranoia and social fear and mistrust that conservative columnists and broadcasters can breed." They released their first extended play Demo on December 9, 2016.

On January 20, 2018, they released the self-titled EP Ubik, which includes the song "The Fly" named after the movie of the same name.
,
On May 5, 2018, they released a collaboration EP with the band Cold Meat called Ubik / Cold Meat Split, where they covered X's song "Nausea" from their debut album Log Angeles.

On September 27, 2019, the band released their debut album Next Phase after a brief hiatus. The album had a launch event that included Vampire, Bitumen and The Uglies, but the event was met with sound issues. Daniel Lupton of Sorry State Records called it a "very riffing and melodic, but also a little aggressive."

Members 
Ashleigh "Ash" Wyatt – vocals
Tessa Tribe – guitar
Nellie Pearson – bass and vocals
Max Kohane – drums

Former 
Chris Simpson – drums (2016)

Discography

Albums

Extended plays

References 

Australian punk rock groups